"The Light Bulb Scene" is the first episode of the fifth season of American animated television series BoJack Horseman. It was written by Kate Purdy and directed by Adam Parton. The episode was released in the United States, along with the rest of season five, via Netflix on September 14, 2018. Whoopi Goldberg and Natalie Morales provide voices in guest appearances in the episode.

Plot 
BoJack works on his new web-series Philbert, an original show from WhatTimeIsItRightNow.com, a company that interviews Todd for a job. The show is co-produced by Princess Carolyn, who mulls an adoption.

Music 
The song "Los Ageless" by artist St. Vincent is featured in this episode, both in the opening scene and over the closing credits.

References

External links 
 "The Light Bulb Scene" on Netflix
 

2018 American television episodes
BoJack Horseman episodes